Li Gaobo (born 4 May 1989) is a male race walker from PR China. His personal best time is 1:18:07 hours, achieved in April 2005 in Cixi.

He finished thirteenth in the 20 kilometres event at the 2007 World Championships.

Achievements

References

1989 births
Living people
Chinese male racewalkers